Yaar Baash is a 2006 film, and writer is Qadir Khan 
In 2006, Mazhar Movies ranked the movie amongst the Top 25 Must See Pollywood Films.

Cast 

 Ajab Gul 
 Jahangir khan jani 
 Alisha 
 Asima
 Nadir Ali Khan

References

External links
about pashto film

2006 films
Pashto-language films
Afghan drama films
Pakistani drama films